The 2006 North Hertfordshire District Council election was held on 4 May 2006, at the same time as other local elections across England. 18 of the 49 seats on North Hertfordshire District Council were up for election, being the usual third of the council plus a by-election in Knebworth ward. The Conservatives made a net increase of five seats on the council, increasing their majority.

Overall results
The overall results were as follows:

Ward Results
The results for each ward were as follows. An asterisk(*) indicates a sitting councillor standing for re-election.

The by-election in Knebworth ward was triggered by the resignation of Conservative councillor Robin Wordsworth.

References

2006 English local elections
2006